Kunai-kyō (jp: 宮内卿) was a 13th century Japanese poet. A prominent poet during the Kamakura period, she is considered one of the Thirty-Six Female Immortals of Poetry.

References 

13th-century Japanese poets